Stop and search or Stop and frisk is a term used to describe the powers of the police to search a person, place or object without first making an arrest.

A 2021 survey by the European Union Agency for Fundamental Rights found that minority ethnic groups were disproportionately targeted across Europe, even though it is unlawful for police to stop and search someone solely on grounds of race or ethnicity. Romani and sub-Saharan Africans were particularly affected. 

Examples in specific jurisdictions include:

 in England and Wales
 in Scotland
Stop and frisk, in the United States

References

Searches and seizures